Hanna Harrell (born September 26, 2003) is an American figure skater. She is the 2016 U.S. juvenile silver medalist, the 2018 U.S. junior pewter (fourth-place) medalist, and the 2019 U.S. senior pewter medalist. In 2019, she represented her country at the World Junior Championships, finishing 7th.

Personal life 
Harrell was born on September 26, 2003, in Russellville, Arkansas. She is of Japanese descent through her mother, Atsuko Tamura. Harrell competed in artistic gymnastics up through Level 7. She has a cat named Whiskers.

Career

Early years 
Harrell began learning to skate as a three-year-old at the  Diamond Edge Figure Skating Club in Little Rock, Arkansas. At age seven, she relocated for training to Dallas, Texas, where she was coached by Natalia Mishkutionok for one year before joining Olga Ganicheva and Aleksey Letov.

2015–2016 season
At the 2016 U.S. Championships, Harrell won the juvenile silver medal (behind Stephanie Ciarochi).

2017–2018 season
In the 2017–2018 season, she debuted in the ISU Junior Grand Prix series.

At the 2018 U.S. Championships, she won the junior pewter medal behind Alysa Liu, Pooja Kalyan and Ting Cui.

2018–2019 season
Harrell was diagnosed with a foot injury in late August 2018. She wore a protective boot for more than a month and was off the ice completely for two to three weeks. She stated, "I had a bad injury on my foot, and I had two stress reactions, and they were almost fractured".

In October, Harrell placed seventh at her JGP assignment in Yerevan, Armenia. In January, at the 2019 U.S. Championships, she won the senior pewter medal (behind Alysa Liu, Bradie Tennell and Mariah Bell). In March, she (along with Ting Cui) represented the United States at the 2019 World Junior Championships in Zagreb, Croatia. Ranked fifth in the short, she competed in the final group during the free skate. She finished seventh overall after placing ninth in the free skate.

2019–2020 season
Harrell opened the season at the Philadelphia Summer International, where she won the bronze medal. Given two Junior Grand Prix assignments, she placed seventh at the 2019 JGP France.  Harrell had to withdraw from the 2019 JGP Italy due to a stress fracture in her foot that was repeatedly misdiagnosed.  Harrell's injury subsequently forced her to withdraw from the rest of the season, including her place on the American team to the 2020 Winter Youth Olympics in Lausanne, Switzerland.

2020–2021 season
Harrell returned to competition at the 2021 U.S. Championships, where she placed seventeenth out of seventeen skaters.

2021–2022 season
Harrell began the season making her Challenger series debut at the 2021 CS Golden Spin of Zagreb, finishing seventh. She went on to place eighth at the 2022 U.S. Championships.

Programs

Competitive highlights 
CS: Challenger Series; JGP: Junior Grand Prix

References

External links 

 

2003 births
American female single skaters
Living people
People from Russellville, Arkansas
People from Plano, Texas
American sportspeople of Japanese descent
21st-century American women